Channel 6 may refer to:

Television and radio channels
 Channel 6 (El Salvador), a Salvadoran television channel owned by Telecorporación Salvadoreña
 Channel 6 (Ireland), an Irish television channel (2006–2009)
 Channel 6 (Israel), an Israeli kids cable television channel
 Channel 6 (Korea), flagship station of South Korean television and radio network Seoul Broadcasting System
 Channel 6 – Bariloche, a television station in San Carlos de Bariloche, Argentina
 CCN TV6, television channel on Trinidad and Tobago
 RTV 6, a television station in Indianapolis, Indiana, United States
 SBS 6, a commercial TV channel in the Netherlands
 Six TV, a former television channel in the United Kingdom
 Tokyo Broadcasting System Television and Japan News Network members TV station in Japan
 Multimedios Televisión, a Mexican regional television network broadcasting on virtual channel 6 and branding as "Canal Seis"
 3e, a television channel in Ireland, known as Channel 6 from 2006 to 2009

Fiction
 Channel 6, a fictional television channel in The Simpsons; see Media in The Simpsons
 Channel 6, a fictional television station in the Teenage Mutant Ninja Turtles; see Teenage Mutant Ninja Turtles (1987 TV series)

See also
 6 News (disambiguation), the news departments of various television stations
 TV6 (disambiguation), the name of television stations in various countries
 Channel 6 branded TV stations in the United States
 Channel 6 digital TV stations in the United States
 Channel 6 low-power TV stations in the United States
 Channel 6 TV stations in Canada
 Channel 6 virtual TV stations in Canada
 Channel 6 virtual TV stations in the United States

06